{{Infobox television
| image                =
| caption              = 
| alt_name             = 
| genre                = DramaRevengeCostume period
| writer               = Kom-Rae Ngao (concept story)Paak Rapee (writer)
| director             = Teerasak Promngoen
| starring             = Pachrapa ChaichuaChiranan ManochaemKelly Tanapat Chawallakorn WanthanapisitkulTussaneeya Karnsomnuch
| theme_music_composer = 
| opentheme            = "Plerng Phra Nang" by Jennifer Kim
| endtheme             = "Tuk Yang Puer Ther" by Ditkorn Disayanon
| composer             = 
| country              = Thailand
| language             = Thai
| num_episodes         = 26
| list_episodes        = 
| executive_producer   = Somsook Kaljaruek
| producer             = Chitralada Disayanon
| location             = Chiang Mai, Thailand
| cinematography       = 
| editor               = 
| camera               = 
| runtime              = 130 minutes (per episode)Fridays, Saturdays and Sundays at 20:30 (ICT)
| company              = Bangkok Broadcasting & T.V. Co., Ltd Kantana Movie Town (2002) Co., Ltd
| distributor          = Bangkok Broadcasting & T.V. Co., LtdKantana Movie Town (2002) Co., Ltd
| picture_format       = 
| audio_format         = 
| first_aired          = 
| last_aired           = 
| preceded_by          = Evening News: Second Edition
| followed_by          = Chid Jor Ror Doo| related              = 
| channel              = Channel 7 
}}Plerng Phra Nang (lit: Her Majesty's Flame; English title: The Royal Fire) was a Thai TV drama or lakorn. It aired on Thailand's Channel 7 from February 17 to April 15, 2017 on Fridays, Saturdays and Sundays at 20:30 for a total of 26 episodes.

Plot summary
The story is a thinly veiled depiction of the life story of Hsinbyumashin, queen of Burma (now Myanmar). It is set in the fictional country of Muang Thip.  Lady Ananthip has been stripped of her royal title. Her father, the late King Pitula, was deposed in a coup led by King Burapha Kham, who is the elder brother of Crown Princess Sekkaradewi. Out of resentment, she seeks revenge and precipitates the loss of Muang Thip's independence.

Cast
Main characters

Supporting characters

Criticism, impact and ratings
Plerng Phra Nang is a remake of a 1996 drama of the same name, also produced by Kantana Group. The script was based on M.R.Kukrit Pramoj’s 1969 nonfiction book The Fall of the Burmese (พม่าเสียกรุง) and Prince Damrong Rajanubhab’s Journey Through Burma in 1936: A View of the Culture, History and Institutions (เที่ยวเมืองพม่า).

Comparisons were made between the costumes of the characters in the 2017 version and those worn by Fan Bingbing in The Empress of China.''  There were also complaints that some scenes were unrealistic.

Soe Win, the great-grandson of Thibaw Min, the last King of Burma, called the drama "unwatchable" and "distasteful" and asked for the series to be taken off the air. The producer, Chitralada Disayanon, argued that the plot was "“unrelated to Burma and is completely fictional, with the costumes and setting not meant to evoke any country or time period in particular”. However, the massacre of 100 royal family members is a clear reference to events in Burma in 1879. There is also a direct mapping between the members of the Burmese royal family of the time and the characters in the drama: Lady Ananthip is Hsinbyumashin, King Muangkoom is Mindon Min, Queen Pinmanee is Queen Supayalat, King Maanfah is Thibaw Min, Upparat Kanaung is Kanaung Mintha and King Burapha Kham is Tharrawaddy Min.

Awards and nominations

References

External links
  

2017 Thai television series debuts
2017 Thai television series endings
Channel 7 (Thailand) original programming
Period television series
Thai television soap operas